Lady's Wood is a  nature reserve west of Upwood in Cambridgeshire. It is managed by the Wildlife Trust for Bedfordshire, Cambridgeshire and Northamptonshire.

This wood was a traditional coppice, but many of the trees were cut down in the 1950s. Birds include blackcaps, fieldfares and green woodpeckers and there are invertebrates such as orange-tip butterflies and azure damselflies.

There is access by a footpath from Bentley Close in Upwood.

References

Wildlife Trust for Bedfordshire, Cambridgeshire and Northamptonshire reserves